Posyan or Pesyan may refer to:
 Posyan, Ajab Shir
 Pesyan, Khoda Afarin